Sam Rapira may refer to:

 Sam Rapira, Rugby League 
 Sam Rapira (boxer), Boxing Promoter and Professional Boxer